The Death of the Virgin is a 1639 print in etching and drypoint by Rembrandt, showing the death of the Virgin Mary from The Golden Legend.

External links
http://expositions.bnf.fr/rembrandt/grand/053.htm
http://www.gallery.ca/fr/voir/collections/artwork.php?mkey=4391
http://expositions.bnf.fr/rembrandt/grand/053.htm
https://www.rijksmuseum.nl/en/collection/RP-P-OB-624

1639 works
Prints by Rembrandt
Prints including the Virgin Mary